Patizeithes was a Persian magus (priest) who flourished in the second half of the 6th century BC. According to Herodotus, he persuaded his brother Smerdis (Gaumata) in 521 BC to rebel against Cambyses II (530–522 BC), who at the time ruled as King of Kings of the Achaemenid Persian Empire. Herodotus states that Patizeithes was eventually killed by Cambyses's successor Darius (later "the Great") (522–486 BC). 

The name "Patizeithes" is the form recorded by Herodotus. Dionysius of Miletus cited his name as Panzouthes, which is identical to Pazates as recorded by Xanthus the Lydian. The later Roman historian Justin recorded his name as Oropastes. According to the modern Iranologist Josef Wiesehöfer, the name "Patizeithes" should be interpreted as a title, "although it is etymologically unclear". Wiesehöfer notes that the name may be connected to the word Pitiáchēs as recorded in later Greek sources, which is known in Middle Persian as btḥšy (bidaxsh), i.e. "viceroy".

References

Sources
 

6th-century BC deaths
Year of birth unknown
Year of death unknown
6th-century BC Iranian people
Zoroastrian priests
People from the Achaemenid Empire
Magi